Eupithecia detritata is a moth in the  family Geometridae. It is found in the Russian Far East, Japan and Korea.

The wingspan is about 22 mm. The ground colour of the wings is greyish.

References

Moths described in 1897
detritata
Moths of Asia